MP3 Disques is a French pop music record label founded in 2004 in Montreal.  The independent label was established by singer Mario Pelchat and is operated by Lionel Lavault. The first album released by the label was Pelchat's own Noël avec Jireh Gospel Choir. The second release, in 2006, was again Pelchat's titled Le monde où je vais.

Over the years, MP3 Disques has released albums by Cindy Daniel, Ytheband, Nadja and Étienne Drapeau.

Catalogue
November 2004: Mario Pelchat - Noël avec Jireh Gospel Choir (AMPCD7894)
March 2006: Mario Pelchat - Le monde où je vais (AMPCD7895)
March 2006: Cindy Daniel - J'avoue (AMPCD7896)
October 2006: Various Artists - Quand le country dit bonjour, volume 1 (AMPCD7897)
May 2007: Various Artists - MexiCanciones (AMPCD7898)
October 2007: Various Artists - Quand le country dit bonjour, volume 2 (AMPCD7899)
August 2008: Cindy Daniel - Le tout premier jour (AMPCD7900)
January 2009: Ytheband - What the city does to people (AMPCD7901)
September 2009: Nadja - Nadja (AMPCD7902)
September 2010: Étienne Drapeau - Paroles & Musique (AMPCD7903)

External links
MP3 Disques Official website

Record labels established in 2004
Canadian independent record labels
Pop record labels
Companies based in Montreal